Shahin Karaj Football Club is an Iranian football club based in Karaj, Iran. They competed in the 2011–12 Iran Football's 3rd Division.

Season-by-season
The table below shows the achievements of the club in competitions.

See also
 Hazfi Cup
 Iran Football's 3rd Division 2011–12

Football clubs in Iran
Association football clubs established in 2008
2008 establishments in Iran